Love is Blind: Japan is a Japanese reality dating streaming television series which premiered on Netflix on February 8, 2022. The show is hosted by Takashi Fujii and Yuka Itaya.

Following the format of Love Is Blind, a group of men and women tried to find future partners for marriage. The original language is in Japanese and features 11 episodes.

Season summary

References

External links 
 

Japanese reality television series
Japanese-language Netflix original programming
Japanese television series based on American television series
2022 Japanese television series debuts
Japanese-language television shows
Dating and relationship reality television series
Television shows set in Japan
Television shows filmed in Japan
Television series about marriage
Wedding television shows